The Edmonton Soccer Dome is an air-supported structure located in Edmonton, Canada.

Along with its primary tenant Edmonton Scottish SC, the dome also served as the pre-season training facility for the former Canadian Premier League club FC Edmonton and as a temporary home for the ACAC's NAIT Ooks during the replacement of NAIT station. In addition to the facility and its grounds being named in the United 2026 FIFA World Cup bid as a potential team base camp in 2018, the dome has most notably hosted La Liga squad Real Valladolid, the Canadian men's national team, and Prime Minister Justin Trudeau.

Facilities 
Made of an inflatable, tensile fabric skin structure, the dome is fully air-climatized for year-round use. Inside, the playing surface can be configured to support several different soccer game models, with markings for four 7v7 pitches, three 9v9 pitches, or one 11v11 pitch. In addition to pitch markings, a two-lane,  running track surrounds the playing surface. Adjacent to the dome sits a pavilion, with four dressing rooms, offices, and a lounge with full bar and concessions.

In 2021, the Edmonton Scottish Society announced plans to build a new clubhouse with additional amenities to support the dome, including twelve changing rooms, a bar, a restaurant, and a banquet hall.

References

External links 

Sports venues in Edmonton
Soccer in Edmonton
Sports venues completed in 2018
Air-supported structures